Simeon Raleigh (24 March 1909 – 1 December 1934) was an English professional footballer.

Raleigh's clubs included Huddersfield Town, Hull City and Gillingham. While playing for Gillingham in a match against Brighton & Hove Albion on 1 December 1934, he suffered a haemorrhage following a blow to the head and died in hospital later the same day. The club raised over £250 for his widow and child.

References

1909 births
1934 deaths
Footballers from Rotherham
English footballers
English Football League players
Association football forwards
Hull City A.F.C. players
Gillingham F.C. players
Huddersfield Town A.F.C. players
Association football players who died while playing
Sport deaths in England